The 2006–07 Süper Lig was the 49th edition of the top-flight professional football league in Turkey. The season began on 4 August 2006 with a match between Ankaraspor and Galatasaray, resulting in a 1–1 draw. Fenerbahçe became champions after drawing Trabzonspor 2–2, while Beşiktaş lost 3–0 to Bursaspor and Galatasaray drew 1–1 with Sivasspor. Kayseri Erciyesspor gained qualification to the UEFA Cup because of Beşiktaş' qualification to the UEFA Champions League Second Qualifying Round.

Since Turkey dropped from 11th to 15th place in the UEFA association coefficient rankings at the end of the 2005–06 season, the cup winner (or the third-placed team if the domestic cup winner already qualified for UEFA Champions League) will not directly be entered into the first round of the UEFA Cup, but would begin in the second qualification round.

League table

Results

Statistics

Top goalscorers

Top assists

Hat-tricks

Stadiums

Teams promoted/relegated
The teams promoted from the TFF First League in 2005-06 season:
Bursaspor (1st)
Antalyaspor (2nd)
Sakaryaspor (Play-off winner)
The teams relegated to the TFF First League in 2005-06 season:
Diyarbakırspor (18th)
Samsunspor (17th)
Malatyaspor (16th)

References

External links

Statistics 
Turkish football league data
Turkish leagues homepage

Süper Lig seasons
Turkey
1